Emilio Ogñénovich (January 25, 1923 – January 29, 2011) was the Catholic bishop of the Archdiocese of Mercedes-Luján, Argentina. Ogñénovich was born to a father from Cetinje and a mother "from Zadar or Split"; they both died when he was ten years old. Ordained to the priesthood in 1949, Ogñénovich was named in bishop in 1979 retiring in 2000. He died in 2011, four days after his 88th birthday.

On 27 June 1992 he was co-consecrator of Jorge Mario Bergoglio, later Pope Francis, as bishop.

References

1923 births
2011 deaths
20th-century Roman Catholic archbishops in Argentina
Roman Catholic bishops of Bahía Blanca
Roman Catholic bishops of Mercedes-Luján
Roman Catholic archbishops of Mercedes-Luján

Argentine people of Montenegrin descent
Argentine people of Croatian descent